Pandit Raghunath Murmu Academy of Santali Cinema & Art ('RASCA', Santali :meaning Joy),  is a cine academy and is formed to promote and develop Santali films.

Activities 

This academy classes are provided to the students in acting & dancing primarily along with technical education of film equipments along with guest lectures.

Surya Singh Besra, the director of RASCA announced the launch of santali film awards, at a meeting held on February 3, 2008.
RASCA's major achievement is that it arranges an award programme for Santali Films each year on 5 May, in which persons related to Santali Films are awarded with certificates, trophies and cash.

The first award ceremony was held on 5 May 2008, at XLRI Auditorium, Jamshedpur.

Award programme was not organised in the year 2009 due to parliamentary elections, & in 2010 due to inadequate number films for nominations, which broke the continuity of organising the award programme each year.

RASCA Award Ceremony 2008 

This was the maiden award ceremony organised by RASCA, & was held on 5 May 2008, at XLRI Auditorium, Jamshedpur.

RASCA Award Ceremony 2011 

2nd RASCA Award was organised in 2011 after a gap of 2 yrs, which became the starting point of continuity, for organising the award programme each year. The award programme was held at Michael John Auditorium, Bistupur.

RASCA Award Ceremony 2012 

The third RASCA Award Ceremony was held on Saturday 05/05/2012, at Birsa Munda Town Hall, Sidhgora.

RASCA Award Ceremony 2013 

The fourth RASCA Award Ceremony was held on Sunday 5 May 2013, at XLRI Auditorium, Jamshedpur.

RASCA Award Ceremony 2014 

The 5th RASCA Award Ceremony was held on Monday 05/05/2014, at Sidgora Town hall, Jamshedpur.

See also 
 Santali Language
 Santali Latin Alphabet
 Ol Chiki Script
 Ol Chiki Alphabet
 Santali People
 Santali Alphabet
 Santhals
 Santhal

References 

Santhal